The American Sculling Championship for professionals are rowing races conducted under the challenge system. For details of this see World Sculling Championship, Challenges.

All races were with a turn.

The following table shows winners from 1859 to 1888. Other races must have taken place at a later date and others may be add to this table.

 Walter Brown died in March 1871 while still Champion

A much later race occurred when Tom Sullivan (rower) attempted to win the Championship of America in August 1905 when he raced Edward Durnan of Canada in a 3-mile (4.8 km) race in Toronto. Sullivan was soundly beaten and Durnan went on to unsuccessfully challenge for the World Sculling Title. Durnan was Hanlan's nephew.

References 
 
The New York Clipper Annual 1892.

'Edward Hanlan America's Champion Oarsman' by R K Fox. 1880. (note, Hanlan was Canadian.)

Rowing in Canada
Rowing competitions in the United States